Hugh Davis Merrill (December 20, 1877 – January 5, 1954) was an American politician who served as the 12th Lieutenant Governor of Alabama from 1931 to 1935.

John Merrill, who serves as Secretary of State of Alabama, is a relative.

References

External links
Biography  by the Alabama Department of Archives & History

1877 births
1954 deaths
Lieutenant Governors of Alabama
Alabama state court judges
Democratic Party members of the Alabama House of Representatives
Speakers of the Alabama House of Representatives